Daina Levy (born May 27, 1993) is a Jamaican hammer thrower. She competed at the 2016 Summer Olympics in the women's hammer throw event; her result in the qualifying round did not qualify her for the final.

References

1993 births
Living people
Jamaican female athletes
Female hammer throwers
Olympic athletes of Jamaica
Athletes (track and field) at the 2016 Summer Olympics
Athletes (track and field) at the 2015 Pan American Games
Pan American Games competitors for Jamaica